Máku , also spelled Mako (Spanish Macú), and in the language itself Jukude, is an unclassified language and likely language isolate once spoken on the Brazil–Venezuela border in Roraima along the upper Uraricoera and lower Auari rivers, west of Boa Vista, by the Jukudeitse. 300 years ago, the Jukude territory was between the Padamo and Cunucunuma rivers to the southwest.

The last speaker, Sinfrônio Magalhães, died in 2000. There are currently no speakers or rememberers of Máku and no-one identifies as Jukude any longer. Aryon Rodrigues and Ernesto Migliazza, as well as Iraguacema Lima Maciel, worked on the language, and the data was collected into a grammar by Chris Rogers published in 2020.

Name
The people called themselves jukude-itse  (person-PL) 'people'. Maku ~ Mako (in Spanish orthography Macu or Maco) is an Arawakan term for unintelligible languages and people held in servitude in the Orinoco region. (See Maku people for a partial list.) While the stress of the word in other languages called 'Maku' may be on either the first or final syllable, as Máku/Mácu or Makú/Macú (Migliazza, Fabré), the word was pronounced with initial stress by the jukudeitse and so the name is often written with stress on the first syllable: Máku (Dixon & Aikhenvald (1999), Maciel (1991), and Rogers (2020)) or Máko (Campbell 2012), though also Makú or simply Maku (Migliazza). The disambiguator Maku-Auari has also been used.

Genetic relations
Suggested genetic relations involving Máku include:

 with Arawakan
 with Warao
 within a Kalianan grouping with Arutani–Sape (a.k.a. Makú)
 within a Macro-Puinavean grouping with Nadahup (a.k.a. Makú), Katukinan, and Arutani–Sape

Kaufman (1990) finds the Kalianan proposal "promising", though he is now dated.

Language contact
Jolkesky (2016) notes that there are lexical similarities with the Sape, Arutani, and Warao languages, as well as the Saliba-Hodi, Tikuna-Yuri, Katukina-Katawixi, and Arawa language families due to contact.

Phonology
The Máku syllable structure is (C)(C)V(V)(C).

/k/ is voiced to  intervocalically and can occasionally be realized as [g] in other environments too.

/j/ is sometimes realized as  word-initially before /a u/ or word-medially, as in /jukude/ [ʑokude̞] 'person'.

Nasals assimilate to the place of articulation of the stop they precede.

/w/ is realized as  before /i e/. It is realized as [ʋ] or  before /y/ (a sequence which only occurs in the word /lymywy/ 'take'). Rogers (2020) does not state that /w/ is realized as [ʋ] before /ɨ/, but provides the example /wɨtsɨ/ [ʋɨtsɨ] 'mouth'.

/d/ is realized as laminal before [u] – in some words this is in free variation with [d].

/s, ts, n, k/ are palatalized to [ʃ, tʃ, ɲ, c] before /i, y/, while /t, d, l/ become [tʲ, dʲ, lʲ].

Although there exist minimal pairs between /o/ and /u/, some words show free variation between /u/ and /o/, and [o] is an allophone of /u/ in some environments. Rogers (2020) hypothesizes that these patterns are a result of a diachronic sound change in progress and that /o u/ do not represent separate phonemes synchronically. 

Apart from the sequences [eo], [au~ao] and [ia], as well as /ai oi/ [aj oj] within a word stem, vowel-vowel sequences are resolved by deleting the first vowel of the sequence, e.g. /teana/ [tana] 'I smell (it)'. The first vowel in a stem may also be deleted in fast speech.

/a/ and /e/ are realized as  when unstressed. 

High and mid vowels are lowered word-finally.

Vowels are nasalized following a nasal consonant, /ʔ/ or /h/.

Grammar
Máku nouns and verbs inflect for person - either the person of the possessor, on nouns, expressed by a prefix, or of the subject and object, on verbs, which may be prefixes, infixes or suffixes, depending on the verb. There are also suffixes which express plurality of a possessor or subject. The language marks clusivity by distinguishing first person singular from first + second person (inclusive), first + third person (exclusive) and first + second + third person ('unified'). Nouns also inflect for number and case via suffixes. Verbs also inflect for tense, aspect, mood, evidentiality and negation via suffixes.

Noun phrases exhibit the word order possessor possessor-possessed, or noun-modifier. Demonstratives and numerals typically occur before the nouns they modify. There are postpositions which follow nouns.

Intransitive clause word order is typically subject-verb, and transitive clause word order is most commonly SOV. Indirect objects are typically placed after the verb. Phrases which represent new, focused referents may be fronted to the start of a clause or sentence. Any phrase in focus, both nominal and verbal, can take the focus enclitic =ke.

Máku has motion-complement serial verb constructions, with subject-verbal complement-motion verb order.

Coordination is accomplished via juxtaposition, at the phrase and clause levels.

Nouns
Máku nouns decline for number, case and possession. Possession is expressed by a prefix, with certain nonsingular possessors adding a separate suffix. Nonsingular number and case are expressed as suffixes. The Máku noun template is -stem-.--case, as demonstrated by the following examples.

Possession
The following sample paradigms illustrate the possessive morphemes – note the three-way clusivity distinction, differentiating both 1+2 (inclusive) and 1+3 (exclusive) as well as the case where the speaker, listener and other(s) are included (1+2+3), which Rogers (2020) refers to as 'unified'. The alienable and inalienable possessive paradigms only differ in the expression of the  morpheme. The 1st person inclusive and 3rd person nonsingular forms are formally identical.

The stem change on 'mouth' in the non-3 possessed forms is one example of an inalienably possessed noun exhibiting a suppletive stem with overt possessive prefixes, of which there are others in Máku.

Note also the following, as an example of an alienably possessed noun with -nuʔu in the 2 possessed form.

Number
Number is marked by a nonsingular suffix -itse, which does not depend on animacy. This suffix is not realized for semantically plural referents when the noun is treated as a collective group, or if the noun is modified by a numeral or quantifier.

Case
There are nine attested case suffixes in Máku:

Pronouns
Máku pronouns mark person, number and clusivity.

There are at least two demonstrative pronouns ki 'this' and (a)kwa 'that' - these can take the locative, lative and inessive cases to form demonstrative adverbs.

Quantifiers
Numerals may take the classifiers -sy 'period of time' and -ʔnte 'body part', but these appear to be optional.

The numerals one to four and peʔtaka 'all' are attested to agree in person with nouns they modify if the person is 1, 1 or 2.

Verbs
Máku verbs inflect for subject and direct object as well as tense, aspect, mood, evidentiality and negation. Subject agreement can be marked via prefixes, infixes or suffixes, depending on the verb in question, and plural subjects add a suffix. Tense, aspect, mood, evidentiality and negation are expressed through suffixes. Object agreement precedes subject agreement, but is not well known due to lack of data. The relative ordering of the TAME morphemes is also not well known due to lack of documentation, although tense and aspect suffixes are mutually exclusive.

Subject agreement

The -pu in the 3 subject marker is optional and indicates collectivity of an action.

Tense
There are five tense morphemes in Máku: distant past, recent past, present, near future, and distant future. While the tense boundaries are relative and not absolute, distant past is used just for mythological stories, and generally the distant future refers to events after the current day while the near future refers to events later in the day.

Aspect

Máku has six aspect morphemes.

The permanent aspect suffix -na is used only with stative verbs and marks permanent and inherent properties.

The temporary aspect suffix -sia indicates temporary properties when used with stative verbs, and unfinished action with active verbs.

The progressive aspect suffixes are present tense in meaning.

Mood

Verbs marked for the imperative do not have an explicit subject marker. However the hortative does agree with subject.

The conditional mood only occurs in multiclause constructions. However, the purposive can occur both in multiclause and monoclausal sentences, as shown in the below examples.

Evidentiality

The evidentiality suffixes are only used with past tense and are not obligatory.

Negation

Negation is signified by -ʔV, where the value of the vowel is the vowel before the suffix, unless followed by -bala, in which case it is /a/.

Transitive active verbs can optionally take the additional negative suffix -bala following -ʔV.

-ʔV can also be used as a prohibitive marker, as in 

The negative suffix appears to precede the evidential suffixes, which appear to precede the tense suffixes, as in the following:

Vocabulary
Loukotka (1968) lists the following basic vocabulary items for Máku.

{| class="wikitable sortable"
! gloss !! Máku
|-
| one || nukuzamuké
|-
| two || bãtá
|-
| three || shünãlyá
|-
| head || tsi-gáte
|-
| eye || tsis-kóte
|-
| tooth || tse-um
|-
| man || lásepa
|-
| water || náme
|-
| fire || níheː
|-
| sun || kélé
|-
| maize || lükü
|-
| jaguar || zówi
|}

References

Bibliography
 
 
Dixon & Aikhenvald (1999). "Máku", in The Amazonian Languages (pp. 361–362)
 
 
 
 
 
 Migliazza, Ernesto (1965). "Fonología Makú", Boletim do MPEG. Antropología 25:1–17.
———— (1966). "Esbôço sintático de um corpus da língua Makú", Boletim do MPEG. Antropología 32:1–38.
———— (1978). "Makú, Sapé and Uruak languages. Current status and basic lexicon", AL 20/3:133–140.
 Rogers, Chris (2020). Máku: A Comprehensive Grammar. Taylor & Francis.

Language isolates of South America
Indigenous languages of Western Amazonia
Languages of Venezuela
Languages extinct in the 2000s
Macro-Puinavean languages